James or Jim McCann may refer to:
James McCann (baseball) (born 1990), American baseball player
James McCann (bishop) (1897–1983), Anglican Bishop of Meath 1945–59, Archbishop of Armagh 1959–69
James McCann (businessman), American entrepreneur who founded 1-800-Flowers
James McCann (drugs trafficker) (born 1939), Irish drugs trafficker, known as Jim
James McCann (Drogheda MP) (died 1873), Member of Parliament for Drogheda 1852–65
James McCann (St Stephen's Green MP) (1840–1904), Member of Parliament for Dublin St Stephen's Green 1900–04
James McCann (Wisconsin politician) (1924–2009), American politician
James Joseph McCann (1886–1961), Canadian politician
Jim McCann (musician) (1944–2015), Irish folk musician and entertainer
Jim McCann (writer) (born 1974), American comic book writer
Jim McCann (scientist) (born 1983), American robotics professor at Carnegie Mellon University